The Kallergis family is a Cretan Greek aristocratic family which claims descent from Byzantine Emperor Nikephoros II Phokas, and were at one stage the most powerful noblemen of Crete.

Origin 
According to later tradition, Emperor Alexios II Komnenos sent twelve noble Byzantine families to Crete, in order to strengthen the ties between the island and Constantinople. The families were credited important land and administrative privileges. Ioannis Phokas was one of those 12 Byzantine rulers.

The Phokas name changed to "Kallergis" during the Venetian dominion over Crete, which began in the aftermath of the Fourth Crusade. As Richard von Coudenhove-Kalergi describes in his book  An idea conquers the world  the Kallergis name is composed of the Greek word kalon (=beautiful) and ergon (from ergō="work, task, deed, accomplishment, or purpose") [Greek: Καλλ(ι)έργης > Καλλέργης, known in many versions as Kalergis, Calergis, Kallergi, Callergi, Calergi].

Heraldic ensembles containing the Kallergis family coat of arms  (bendy argent and azure) can be found all over the island of Crete, in churches and other monuments. The name reappears many times in the turbulent history of Crete but also of modern Greece.

Their prominent position and privileges survived during the Venetian dominion of Crete as they were part of the "privilegiati" (Greek: Αρχοντορωμαίοι) and sometimes of "nobili Veneti". They served many times the Venetian regime but at the same time defended the welfare of the Cretan people, being involved in several uprisings, most notably the Revolt of Alexios Kallergis in the late 13th century.

During the Venetian dominion and after the Ottoman conquest of the island of Crete (1669 AD) many of the Kallergis moved to the Ionian islands and Euboea, Venice and Russia.

In Venice the family, hereafter named Calergi in this branch, built bonds with the families of Vendramin, Crespi and Grimani through marriages .

The family is also connected to the Palazzo Vendramin-Calergi, which is found in Venice on the Grand Canal.

See also 

 Calliergis, a genus of moths of the family Noctuidae
 Calliergis ramosa, a moth of the family Noctuidae

References 

Greek noble families
 
Kingdom of Candia